José Salvador Sanchis (born 26 March 1963) is a Spanish former professional racing cyclist. He rode in four editions of the Tour de France, two editions of the Giro d'Italia and five editions of the Vuelta a España. He also competed in the men's road race at the 1984 Summer Olympics.

Major results
1982
 1st Vuelta a Murcia
1986
 1st Stage 5a Vuelta a Cantabria
1989
 5th Road race, National Road Championships
1991
 3rd Circuito de Getxo

Grand Tour general classification results timeline

References

External links
 

1963 births
Living people
Spanish male cyclists
People from Costera
Sportspeople from the Province of Valencia
Cyclists at the 1984 Summer Olympics
Olympic cyclists of Spain
Cyclists from the Valencian Community